Peter Faucett (1813 – 22 May 1894) was an Australian barrister, judge and politician. He was a member of the New South Wales Legislative Assembly between 1856 and 1865. He held the position of Solicitor General in the first government of James Martin. He was a judge of the Supreme Court between 1865 and 1888 and a member of the New South Wales Legislative Council between 1888 and 1894.

Early life
Faucett was born in Dublin in around 1813, the son Catherine  Cook and Peter Faucett, a blacksmith. He was educated at Trinity College where he graduated with a Bachelor of Arts. He was called to the Irish Bar in 1845 and emigrated to Sydney in 1852 and was admitted to the New South Wales Bar on 19 December 1852 where he established a large, private legal practice, regularly appearing in criminal proceedings.

Parliamentary career
Faucett was as a member of the first New South Wales Legislative Assembly which was elected after the establishment of responsible self-government in 1856. He was elected as the member for King and Georgiana and retained the seat, unopposed, at the 1858 election. Faucett was not a candidate at the 1859 election and was an unsuccessful candidate at the 1859 East Maitland by-election caused by the resignation of Joseph Chambers who had accepted a position as Crown Prosecutor in the Western Districts of New South Wales. Faucett was also unsuccessful at a ministerial by-election for the four member seat of East Sydney in November 1859 but eventually re-entered parliament as the member for that seat after winning the 1860 by-election caused by the resignation of Charles Cowper. However he was subsequently defeated at the general election held later that year. King and Georgiana had been replaced by Yass Plains and Faucett again entered parliament as the member for the region  at the 1861 by-election caused by the resignation, due to ill-health of the incumbent Henry O'Brien. He retained the seat until his resignation from the Assembly in 1865 to accept an appointment as a judge of the Supreme Court.

Faucett's only ministerial appointment was as Solicitor General in the first government of James Martin, at a time when the Solicitor General often the conducted criminal prosecutions. It has been said that his career in public office was unspectacular but he had an earnest desire to see justice done and was a "plain-spoken, sober-sided, solid man".

Later life and death
Faucett was appointed a Judge of the Supreme Court on 4 October 1865, serving until 8 February 1888 when he resigned due to ill health. In April he accepted a life appointment to the Legislative Council, which he retained until his death.

He married Frances Susan Clements on 21 January 1862 at St Mary's Cathedral, however she died in childbirth on 3 June 1866.

He had an intense interest in education. He was a Member of the Denominational School Board from 6 March 1854 to July 1864. He was a member of the Committee of Management for the Institute for Destitute Children at Parramatta in 1859. He was a Fellow of the Senate of the University of Sydney from 1859 to 1894 and an honorary examiner in law from 1869 to at least 1891. He was a member of the Council to establish The Women’s College at the University of Sydney in 1891-1892. On 21 August 1857 Faucett introduced a petition and a bill to the New South Wales Parliament for the establishment of St John's College at the University. He was also a Fellow of the College Council from 1858 to 1863. Whilst in Parliament, Faucett advocated state support for religious denominations and their schools, no matter the denomination. He was also involved in the establishment of St Vincent's Hospital.

See also

References

 

1813 births
1894 deaths
Members of the New South Wales Legislative Assembly
Members of the New South Wales Legislative Council
Solicitors General for New South Wales
19th-century Australian politicians
Judges of the Supreme Court of New South Wales
Colony of New South Wales judges
19th-century Australian judges